Bhanotia fasciolata (corrugated pipefish, or barbed pipefish) is a marine fish of the family Syngnathidae. It is found in coral reefs, tidepools, and muddy/silty substrates in the Eastern Indian Ocean and Western Pacific. It is ovoviviparous, with the male carrying the eggs in a brood pouch until they are ready to hatch.

References

Further reading

Australian Government Species Profile and Threats Database
Fishes of Australia

Syngnathidae
Fish described in 1870
Taxa named by Auguste Duméril